Hidayat Khudush oglu Orujov (born September 5, 1944) is an Azerbaijani writer and politician. He became the Chairman of State Committee for Work with Religious Organizations of Azerbaijan Republic in 2006 and is currently serving as the Azerbaijani ambassador to Kyrgyzstan.

Early life
Orujov was born on September 5, 1944 in Maralzami village of Syunik Region, Armenian SSR. He graduated from Philology department of Azerbaijan State University. After graduation, he worked as a teacher in his village and for Soviet Armenia newspaper for a brief period of time, and in July 1968 he was appointed the Director of Jaffar Jabbarli Iravan State Azerbaijan Drama Theater where he worked for 6 years.
As a writer he was known under alias Hidayet. Orujov also headed the Azerbaijani literature Council of the Writers Union of Armenia and taught Azerbaijani Literature of 19th-20th centuries at Armenian State Pedagogical University. He's credited for publishing numerous books on Azerbaijani and Oghuz literature in Yerevan. Orujov has translated numerous books by Armenian authors such as H.Paronyan, V.Petrosyan, K.Sarkisyan, K.Arshakyan from Armenian into Azerbaijani and Russian.
In March 1984, he moved to Baku and was hired as the Assistant Editor of Gənclik (Youth) Publishing House and in March 1986, he was appointed the Chief Editor of the publishing house, a position which he held until 1992. While an editor, he substantially expanded the library of books on Azerbaijan in international markets. A fifteen volume Azerbaijani folklore, twenty five volume Adventures and Mystics, seventeen volume Literature of nations of USSR were published under Orujov's leadership. Orujov has also been board member of Azerbaijani Writer's Union and Literature newspaper.

Political career
In 1992-1993, Orujov served as the State Advisor on Interethnic Relations to the President of Azerbaijan. In 1993-2006, he was the State Advisor on National Policies; in 2005-2006, he served as the State Advisor on Ethnic Minorities and Religious Organizations to the President of Azerbaijan. On June 27, 2006 he was appointed the Chairman of State Committee for Work with Religious Organizations of Azerbaijan Republic replacing Dr. Rafig Aliyev. As the chairman of the state committee, he paid special attention to preventing registrations of religious organizations allegedly being recommended by foreign special services. Hidayat Orujov was appointed the Ambassador of Azerbaijan to the Kyrgyz Republic in December 2012.

Works and awards
Orujov has been awarded with Honorable Arts Contributor of Armenian SSR award in 1978, Order for Personal Courage in 1970, and was honored with awards from the Supreme Soviet of Azerbaijan SSR. In 1989, after Armenians laid claims on Karabakh region of Azerbaijan, Orujov renunciated his award from Armenian SSR. 
Since the independence of Azerbaijan was restored, he has also been awarded with Shohrat Order and For service to the Fatherland Order of Azerbaijan Republic, International Paydulla Iskeyev Literature Award of Chuvash Republic and a number of awards from Georgia and Dagestan.

See also
Cabinet of Azerbaijan
Azerbaijani literature

References 

Azerbaijani-language writers
Armenian Azerbaijanis
1944 births
Living people
Government ministers of Azerbaijan
Azerbaijani educators
Azerbaijani publicists
Recipients of the Shohrat Order
Ambassadors of Azerbaijan to Kyrgyzstan